Immensee railway station is a railway station in the municipality of Küssnacht, in the Swiss canton of Schwyz. It located at the junction of three standard gauge lines of Swiss Federal Railways: the Gotthard, Lucerne–Immensee, and Rapperswil–Immensee.

Services 
 the following services stop at Immensee:

References

External links 
 
 

Railway stations in the canton of Schwyz
Swiss Federal Railways stations